The Central District of Qarchak County is in Tehran province, Iran. At the National Census in 2006, its population (as a part of the former Qarchak District of Varamin County) was 211,949 in 51,400 households. The following census in 2011 counted 230,262 people in 62,905 households. At the latest census in 2016, the district had 269,138 inhabitants in 79,853 households, by which time the district had been separated from the county and Qarchak County established.

References 

Qarchak County

Districts of Tehran Province

Populated places in Tehran Province

Populated places in Qarchak County